Aderald (died 1004) was a canon and archdeacon of Troyes, France, from where he led a pilgrimage to the Holy Land. He brought back a piece of the Holy Sepulchre, and founded a monastery named after it—Saint-Sépulcre—in Villacerf. He was canonized as a saint of the Catholic Church; his feast day is on October 20.

References 

1004 deaths
11th-century French Roman Catholic priests
French Roman Catholic saints
Holy Land travellers
Year of birth unknown
Clergy from Troyes